Sphenarches zanclistes is a moth of the family Pterophoridae that is found in Australia.

Its larvae have been recorded feeding on Dolichos lablab, Vigna unguiculata and Vigna sava.

Original description

External links
Trin Wiki
Australian Insects
Australian Faunal Directory

Moths described in 1905
Moths of Australia
Platyptiliini
Moths of Asia
Taxa named by Edward Meyrick